The 2021–22 Buffalo Bulls women's basketball team represented the University at Buffalo during the 2021–22 NCAA Division I women's basketball season. The Bulls, led by tenth-year head coach Felisha Legette-Jack, play their home games at Alumni Arena as members of the Mid-American Conference.

They finished the season 25–9, 16–4 in MAC play to finish in second place. As the second seed in the MAC tournament they defeated Western Michigan, Akron, and Ball State to win the championship. They received an automatic bid to the NCAA tournament, where they were the thirteenth seed in the Wichita Region.  They were defeated in the First Round by fourth seed Tennessee to end their season.

Previous season 
The Bulls finished the 2020–21 season 15–9, 11–6 in MAC play to win finish in a tie for third place. As the fourth seed in the MAC tournament, they defeated Kent State in the Quarterfinals before losing to Bowling Green in the Semifinals. They were not invited to the NCAA tournament or the WNIT.

Roster

Schedule
Source: 

|-
!colspan=6 style=| Exhibition

|-
!colspan=6 style=| Non-Conference regular season

|-
!colspan=6 style=| MAC regular season

|-
!colspan=6 style=| MAC Tournament

|-
!colspan=6 style=| NCAA tournament

Rankings

The Coaches Poll did not release a Week 2 poll and the AP Poll did not release a poll after the NCAA Tournament.

References

Buffalo
Buffalo Bulls women's basketball seasons
Buffalo Bulls
Buffalo Bulls
Buffalo